Charl Pietersen (born 6 January 1983) is a South African cricketer who played for the Eagles cricket team. He is a distant relative of Kevin Pietersen. His brother Ruan Pietersen also played for Griqualand West as a left-arm bowler. Despite being South African Pietersen played County cricket in England under the Kolpak regulations for Northamptonshire County Cricket Club. On debut for Northamptonshire in 2005, he took 7–10 in a C&G Trophy game against Denmark at Svanholm Park, Brøndby, a county record.

References

External links
 

1983 births
Living people
Cricketers from Kimberley, Northern Cape
South African cricketers
Griqualand West cricketers
Northamptonshire cricketers